Governor Rodrigues may refer to:

Diogo Rodrigues (died 1577), Governor of Salsette from 1535 to 1548
Sarmento Rodrigues (1899–1979), Governor of Portuguese Guinea from 1946 to 1949, Governor General of Salazar from, 1950 to 1951, Governor General of Portuguese Mozambique from 1961 to 1964